Al-Yarmouk FC is Jordan a football, formed in Amman in 1967, the club is currently part of the Jordan League Division 1.

Current squad

Current technical staff

Presidential history
Source:

Honors
Jordan FA Shield: 1
 2006

Managerial History
 Issa Al-Turk
 Essam Hamad Salem
 Thair Jassam
 Khaldoun Abdul-Karim
 Mohammad Al-Yamani
 Ibrahim Helmi

Kit Providers
Adidas

References

External links
 
 
 
 

Football clubs in Jordan
Football clubs in Amman
1967 establishments in Jordan
Sport in Amman
Association football clubs established in 1967